Volovița is a commune in Soroca District, Moldova. It is composed of two villages, Alexandru cel Bun and Volovița.

References

Communes of Soroca District